Cedar Ridge School District (CRSD) is a public school district in Independence County, Arkansas, United States. Cedar Ridge School District serves the Newark, Charlotte, Cord, and Oil Trough communities, and encompasses  of land.

It was formed on July 1, 2004, from the consolidation of the Newark School District and the Cord Charlotte School District.

Schools 
 Cord–Charlotte Elementary School, located in Charlotte and serving kindergarten through grade 6.
 Newark Elementary School, located in Newark and serving kindergarten through grade 6.
 Cedar Ridge High School, located in Newark and serving grades 7 through 12.

References

Further reading
Map of predecessor districts:
  (Download)

External links
 

Education in Independence County, Arkansas
School districts in Arkansas
School districts established in 2004
2004 establishments in Arkansas